Pierre Destailles (1909–1990) was a French film, stage and television actor.  He was also a noted lyricist.

Selected filmography
 Dropped from Heaven (1946)
 Mission in Tangier (1949)
 Suzanne and the Robbers (1949)
 Brilliant Waltz (1949)
 Branquignol (1949)
 Millionaires for One Day (1949)
 The Atomic Monsieur Placido (1950)
 Beware of Blondes (1950)
 A Certain Mister (1950)
 My Wife Is Formidable (1951)
 Under the Sky of Paris (1951)
 Great Man (1951)
 The Voyage to America (1951)
 Légère et court vêtue (1953)
 The Knight of the Night (1953)
 Cadet Rousselle (1954)
 The Price of Love (1955)
 The Anodin Family (1956, TV series)
 And Your Sister? (1958)
 Germinal (1963)
 Speak to Me of Love (1975)

References

Bibliography
 Cenciarelli, Carlo, The Oxford Handbook of Cinematic Listening. Oxford University Press, 2021.
 Goble, Alan. The Complete Index to Literary Sources in Film. Walter de Gruyter, 1999.

External links

1909 births
1990 deaths
French male film actors
French male stage actors
French male television actors
People from Paris

fr:Pierre Destailles